Nigeria Youth SDGs Network which is registered as the Network of Youth for Sustainable Initiative is a youth led and youth serving civil society organization localizing the United Nations Sustainable Development Goals launched in April 2017.

Goal 
The primary goals of the organization is to advocate for meaningful youth engagement in the development of Nigeria by focusing of education and capacity development, employment and livelihoods and civic participation.

The Network and the UN
The organization with funding from the United Nations Department of Economics and Social Affairs worked with the International Labour Organization and the Federal Ministry of Youth and Sports towards the revision of the Nigeria Youth Employment Action Plan (2021-2024). The organization launched in August 2020 survey to understand the decent work aspirations of young Nigerians in the light of COVID-19 and how they want policymakers to support them. More than 100,000 young people responded to the survey over a six weeks period. This was followed by a youth validation workshop held across the 36 states of Nigeria and the FCT. The Nigeria Youth Employment Action Plan was launched in September 2021 and is estimated to meet the decent work aspirations of 3.5 million young Nigerians annually.

Following the launch of the Nigeria Youth Employment Action Plan, NGYouthSDGs with support from the International Labour Organization launched the Skills for Employment Programme, a seven weeks digital skills programme for youth age 18 to 29 whose education or livelihoods was impacted by the COVID19 pandemic. The programme focused on digital marketing, website development and graphics design with 90 young people in Adamawa, Benue and Lagos participating.

As part of the mission of NGYouthSDGs in building the capacity of young Nigerians to advocate in policies and programs that will enable youth to lead and thrive, NGYouthSDGs with funding from the United Nations Information Centre trained 360 young people in Adamawa, Anambra, Kaduna, Kwara, Ondo and Rivers states on environmental and climate justice.

August 12 Celebration
Annually, the organization commemorates the International Youth Day on August 12 and uses that opportunity to showcase youth leading action for sustainable development while providing seed grants for youth social entrepreneurs.

2017
The first event was held in 2017 with the theme On the Road to Implementation. This aimed at encouraging young people to collaborate and inspiring private sector and the government to work with youth.

2018 - 2019
In 2018 and 2019, the Youth Day was held across 21 states in Nigeria with the theme Amplifying Youth Voices.

2020
In 2020, with the impact of COVID-19, the organization in partnership with Oxfam in Nigeria provided a grant of three hundred thousand naira ($833) to three organizations. In 2021, the organization supported three organizations in agriculture with seed funding of six hundred thousand naira ($1,666). For the 2022 International Youth Day, NG Youth SDGs and Oxfam in Nigeria launched the Spotlight Awards to celebrate young people who are leading local action for the Sustainable Development Goals.

In a bid to localize the Sustainable Development Goals, the organization created the SDGs Playbook which contains 200 actionable steps that people can take for SDGs action. The organization is working with Mastercard Foundation to reduce the spread of COVID-19 in 25 communities across 10 states in Nigeria. The organization has been recognized by the United Nations as an SDGs Good Practice.

As part of Nigeria Youth SDGs thought leadership drive, the organization will be hosting a sustainability workshop at the 2022 One Young World Summit in Manchester in partnership with AdamStart. During the event, it will share about the SDGs Playbook, a resource material to activate youth action for the SDGs and providing funding for youth movement in Nigeria with support from VOICE.

References

External links 
 Official website

Youth-led organizations
2017 establishments in Africa
United Nations